François N'Doumbé Léa (born 30 January 1954) is a Cameroonian professional footballer who played as a defender. He was a non-playing squad member for the Cameroon national team at the 1982 FIFA World Cup. He also was part of the side that won the 1984 African Cup of Nations. At a club level he played for Union Douala in Cameroon.

See also
1982 FIFA World Cup squads

References

External links
 
 
 
 

1954 births
Living people
Cameroonian footballers
Association football defenders
Cameroon international footballers
Olympic footballers of Cameroon
Footballers at the 1984 Summer Olympics
1982 FIFA World Cup players
1972 African Cup of Nations players
1982 African Cup of Nations players
1984 African Cup of Nations players
Africa Cup of Nations-winning players
Union Douala players